Rocchetta Sant'Antonio (Foggiano:  or ) is a town and comune in the province of Foggia in the Apulia region of southeast Italy. It was part of the province of Avellino until 1940.

References

Cities and towns in Apulia